Audrey Babcock is an American mezzo-soprano opera singer who has performed in many opera houses throughout the world.

She performed the Lola in Cavalleria Rusticana at the Washington Concert Opera.

Babcock sang the role of Maddalena in Verdi's Rigoletto for Boston Lyric Opera in March 2014. She sang in the first professional staging of Daniel Crozier's opera With Blood, With Ink in April 2014 at the Fort Worth Opera.

Babcock has frequently performed the title role in Bizet's opera Carmen, notably in 2008 at the San Antonio Opera, 2009 at the Utah Festival Opera, and in 2012 at the Florentine Opera. Carmen was her European debut in 2010 at the Savonlinna Opera Festival. In May 2014, she sang Carmen with the Norwalk Symphony Orchestra.

References

External links 

Profile
, Utah Festival Opera 2009

Living people
Year of birth missing (living people)
Place of birth missing (living people)
American operatic mezzo-sopranos
21st-century American women